There are three rivers named Cachorro River in Brazil:
 Cachorro River (Pará)
 Cachorro River (Roraima), a river of Roraima
 Cachorro River (Sergipe)

See also
 Cachorro (disambiguation)